Shuikou Town is an urban town in Yanling County, Hunan Province, People's Republic of China.

Cityscape
The town is divided into 20 villages and one community, the following areas: Shuikou Community, Taoling Village, Muwan Village, Guancangxia Village, Shuikou Village, Shuixi Village, Shuinan Village, Liankeng Village, Zha Village, Banqiao Village, Zaoshu Village, Datang Village, Xilong Village, Yanchi Village, Shuangshan Village, Taoyuan Village, Xiaowan Village, Ziyuan Village, Baiyuan Village, Jiang Village, and Xialong Village.

References

External links

Divisions of Yanling County